Totoli (also known as Tolitoli) is a Sulawesi language of the Austronesian language family spoken by 25,000 people of Central Sulawesi, Indonesia.

Grammar

Voice

Totoli has a symmetrical voice system. In the examples below,  is an actor voice construction, while  is an undergoer voice construction.

The syntactic pivot can be placed before the predicate, as shown:

References

Tomini–Tolitoli languages
Languages of Sulawesi